The 1960–61 Football League Cup was the inaugural staging of the Football League Cup, a knockout competition for England's top 92 football clubs. The competition began on 26 September 1960, and ended with the two-legged final almost a year later on 22 August and 5 September 1961.

The tournament was won by Aston Villa, who beat Rotherham United 3–2 on aggregate after extra time. Rotherham won the first leg 2–0 at Millmoor, their home ground thanks to goals from Alan Kirkman and Barry Webster. In the second leg at Villa Park, Harry Burrows and Peter McParland levelled the tie on aggregate and Alan O'Neill scored in extra-time to win the cup for Aston Villa.

Calendar
5 League teams did not compete (Arsenal, Tottenham Hotspur, Sheffield Wednesday, West Bromwich Albion and Wolverhampton Wanderers). Of the other 87 teams, 41 received a bye to the second round and the other 46 played in the first round. Unlike in later seasons, the byes were assigned randomly; from 1962–63 onward the lower teams played in the first round while the upper division teams joined them in the second round onward.

First round

Ties

Replays

Second Replay

Second round

Ties

Replays

Second Replay

Third round

Ties

Replays

Fourth round

Ties

Replays

Second Replay

Fifth round

Ties

Semi-finals
The semi-final draw was made in February 1961 after the conclusion of the quarter finals. Unlike the rounds up to that point, the semi-final ties were played over two legs, with each team playing one leg at home. The matches were played in March, April and May 1961.

First Leg

Second Leg

Replay

Final

The 1961 League Cup Final was played on 22 August and 5 September 1961 and was contested between First Division side Aston Villa and Second Division team Rotherham United. Aston Villa won the game 3-2 on aggregate (after extra time).

First leg

Second leg

Aston Villa wins 3–2 on aggregate.

References

General

Specific

External links
Results on Soccerbase

EFL Cup seasons
1960–61 domestic association football cups
Lea
Cup